International Network of Women Engineers and Scientists (INWES) is a current network for women professionals, which was founded in 2002 with the intention to support women and girls in engineering and science across the world. The current (2020-2023) President is Jung Sun Kim, from Dongseo University, South Korea.

According to their mission statement, the network seeks to encourage the education and retention of professional women in these fields through international collaboration. The founding of the network received support from UNESCO. Founding members include Canadian engineers Claire Deschênes, Monique Frize and Gail Mattson, current Immediate Past President of INWES and past president of SWE, Society of Women Engineers, USA. The network currently has over 60 countries involved, including the Association of Korean Women Scientists and Engineers, Women's Engineering Society (UK), the German Association of Women Engineers (DIB), the Society of Taiwan Women in Science and Technology (TWiST) and African Women in Science and Engineering (AWSE).

Management of the International Conference of Women Engineers and Scientists 
The network took over the management of the International Conference of Women Engineers and Scientists (ICWES), which first took place in 1964 in New York and has met every 3–4 years since then. ICWES serves as a meeting point for women practitioners in science and engineering from across the world. Since INWES took over the management of the conference, it has taken place in Ottawa, Canada (2002); Seoul, Korea (2005); Lille, France (2008); Adelaide, Australia (2011); Los Angeles, USA (2014); and New Delhi, India (2017). ICWES 18 will take place in Coventry, UK, in 2021.

INWES archives 
The archives of INWES are held in the University of Ottawa Archives and Special Collections.

Education and Research  Institute 

The Education and Research  Institute (INWES-ERI) is an initiative of INWES.

References 

Women in science and technology